Auguste Pünkösdy (1890–1967) was an Austrian stage and film actress.

Selected filmography
 The Giant's Fist (1917)
 Alkohol (1919)
 Circus Saran (1935)
 Little Mother (1935)
 Vienna 1910 (1943)
 Late Love (1943)
 A Salzburg Comedy (1943)
 A Man Like Maximilian (1945)
 Eroica (1949)
 Two Times Lotte (1950)
 Cordula (1950)
 Archduke Johann's Great Love (1950)
  (1951)
 City Park (1951)
 Goetz von Berlichingen (1955)

References

Bibliography
 John T. Soister. Conrad Veidt on Screen: A Comprehensive Illustrated Filmography. McFarland, 2002.

External links

1890 births
1967 deaths
Austrian film actresses
Austrian silent film actresses
Austrian stage actresses
Actresses from Vienna